Manny Nosowsky (born January 1932, in San Francisco, CA) is a U.S. crossword puzzle creator. A medical doctor by training, he retired from a San Francisco urology practice and, beginning in 1991, has created crossword puzzles that have been published in The New York Times, the Wall Street Journal, and many other newspapers.  Will Shortz, the crossword puzzle editor for The New York Times, has described Nosowsky as "a national treasure" and included four Nosowsky puzzles in his 2002 book Will Shortz's Favorite Crossword Puzzles.  Since Shortz became editor of the Times crossword in November 1993, Nosowsky has published nearly 250 puzzles there, making him by far the most prolific published constructor in the Times.  Nosowsky is frequently chosen to produce puzzles for the American Crossword Puzzle Tournament.

Record-breaking puzzle
Nosowsky is known for constructing puzzles with wide-open grids, often published later in the week, for expert solvers.  On July 24, 1998, he set an early record by publishing a standard 15x15 daily crossword puzzle with only 21 black squares.  This record stood until 2001, when Joe DiPietro published a 20-black-square puzzle.  On March 11, 2005, the Times published a Nosowsky puzzle that set the new record: 19 black squares ; this record was finally broken on August 22, 2008, when an 18-black-square puzzle by Kevin Der was published.  On a popular web site for crossword constructors, Nosowsky published an article  describing his method for making the record-breaking puzzle; he also was featured discussing the puzzle in the bonus material for the DVD of the 2006 documentary Wordplay.

His puzzle "Double Digit Inflation" was the first to be published in the Wall Street Journal, which now has a crossword as a weekly feature.

Nosowsky has worked to encourage new puzzle constructors to the field, particularly through contributions to cruciverb.com.  In one article , he argued for the importance of "sparkle" in a puzzle's construction.  He is recognized for clever, sometimes misleading (though "fair"), clues for puzzle entries.  Examples include "Browning piece?" for ELECTRIC TOASTER and "Northern air" for O CANADA.  His cleverness extends to his themed puzzles, as well.  A student of Latin, Nosowsky once produced a puzzle in which common Latin phrases were changed by one letter: QUID PRO QUO became QUID PRO DUO with the jocular clue, "You scratch my back and I'll do the both of us?"  In the same puzzle, TABULA NASA was clued as "Blackboard for rocket scientists?" and others followed in a similar vein.

"Puzzle Lady" mysteries
In collaboration with the mystery novelist Parnell Hall, Nosowsky has produced puzzles that appear in Hall's "Puzzle Lady" novels, such as You Have the Right to Remain Puzzled.  Hall's narrative sets the storyline, and in four of his novels, Nosowsky's puzzles drop clues for the reader.

Nosowsky resides in the Diamond Heights neighborhood of San Francisco with his wife Debby.

References 

Nosowsky, Manny, crossword puzzle maker
Nosowsky, Manny, crossword puzzle maker
Crossword compilers
Nosowsky, Manny, crossword puzzle maker
Physicians from California